Erythrocera is a genus of flies in the family Tachinidae.

Species
E. genalis (Aldrich, 1928)
E. hunanensis Chao & Zhou, 1992
E. neolongicornis O’Hara, Shima & Zhang, 2009
E. nigripes (Robineau-Desvoidy, 1830)

References

Exoristinae
Diptera of Europe
Diptera of Asia
Tachinidae genera
Taxa named by Jean-Baptiste Robineau-Desvoidy